Cape Lamb is a cape which forms the southwestern tip of Vega Island in the James Ross Island group, Antarctica. It was discovered by the Swedish Antarctic Expedition, 1901–04, under Otto Nordenskjold. It was resighted in 1945 by the Falkland Islands Dependencies Survey (FIDS), and named after Ivan M. Lamb (1911–90), a botanist on the FIDS staff at Port Lockroy (1944), Hope Bay (1945), and the leader of a biological expedition to the Melchior Islands, 1964–65.

References

Headlands of the James Ross Island group